The Salmson 4 AB.2, or SAL-4 AB.2 (AB.2 - Reconnaissance Bomber two-seat) was a two-seat bomber designed and built in France during the closing stages of World War I.

Design and development
A variant of the Salmson 2, the Salmson 4 was essentially an enlarged version with a greater wingspan, three bay wings of greater area, enlarged vertical tail surfaces and detail changes to the engine installation. Twelve aircraft were built for l'Aéronautique Militaire before the end of World War I, all of which were assigned to operational escadrilles in anticipation of widespread deployment following orders for mass production, which were cancelled with the end of the war. They were withdrawn in 1920.

Specifications (SAL-4 AB.2)

See also

References

Notes

Citations

Bibliography

1910s French military reconnaissance aircraft
Biplanes
Salmson aircraft
Single-engined tractor aircraft
Aircraft first flown in 1918